Beaver Township is a township in Barton County, Kansas, USA.  As of the 2010 census, its population was 99.

Beaver Township was organized in 1878.

Geography
According to the USGS, it contains four cemeteries: Dubuque, Friends, Presbyterian and Saint Josephs.

References
 USGS Geographic Names Information System (GNIS)

External links
 City-Data.com

Townships in Barton County, Kansas
Townships in Kansas